Jason Keller (born April 23, 1970) is an American professional stock car racing driver. Previously, he was a mainstay in NASCAR's second-tier series, competing in 519 Nationwide Series races between 1991 and 2010. On May 15, 2010, Keller made his 500th career start, the first driver in series history to do so.

Racing career

Early career
Keller was born in Greenville, South Carolina, and began his racing career on kart tracks, moving up to Late-Model Sportsman dirt-track racing at the age of 16.  He drove the #57 Chevy owned by Jack Finley of Easley, South Carolina.

Keller made his Busch series debut in the 1991 May race at Lanier Speedway. He piloted the #54 Air Products Buick home in 29th after starting 8th.

Air Products would sponsor his family-owned team from 1991 to 1994, during that time using the numbers 54 and 45, before finally settling on the #57, a number Jason would use until the end of the 2003 season. Keller grabbed his first top-10 finish in his 7th start at the North Carolina Speedway in February 1993.

His first top-5 would come one year later in the fall race of 1994 at Dover Downs. 1994 would be his first full season, and he finished 17th that year in the points. He did miss a race that season, but up to December 1, 2005, Keller has not missed one since. He won three poles in 1994, his first career coming at Rougemont.

In 1995, Keller received backing from Budget Gourmet, and rewarded them by finishing 4th place in the standings. His first career win occurred in August, as he outpaced the field at Indianapolis Raceway Park. In addition, Keller had 6 top-5s and 12 top-10s that season.

Slim Jim came on board for the 1996 season. Keller secured another top-10 finish in points (6th) with a 10 top-10s season.

Keller struggled through 1997 and 1998, finishing 13th and 16th in the points respective years. He only had 4 top 5s and 17 top 10s in those two years. In 1998, Keller's family owned team had no decals on the car, and that forced the team to sell to the newly formed ppc Racing team.

Breakout
In 1999, with sponsorship from IGA, Keller won 3 poles (Spring Bristol, IRP, Richmond spring) and 2 wins at Bristol Motor Speedway (spring) and IRP. With 5 top 5s and 12 top 10s, Keller came home 8th in the standings.

In 2000, Keller's ppc team received funding from Excedrin. This began to this date, Keller's best streak in his career. In four years (2000–2003), Keller wrapped up 7 wins (one at Dover, two at Nazareth, one at Rockingham, one at Richmond, one at Milwaukee, and one at Talladega.) He won 4 BUSCH poles, and finished 2nd twice in the standings (2000 and 2002), 3rd (2001), and 5th (2003).

Keller has run 2 races in the Cup Series. In 2003, he drove the No. 01 U.S. Army for MB2/MBV Motorsports Pontiac home 32nd in the spring Richmond race, subbing for the just injured Jerry Nadeau, and 26th in the fall Talladega race in the No. 1 for DEI.

The No. 57 team lost Albertsons sponsorship at the end of 2003, and Miller High Life came on board, changing the team's number to 22. Keller had 6 top-5s and 12 top-10s in the year, finishing 6th in 2004.

Later career
In 2005, again without sponsorship, Keller left ppc Racing, and headed towards Team Rensi Motorsports's second operation sponsored by McDonald's. They struggled all year. Despite a 9th-place finish in points, Keller was never competitive. He only had 1 top-5 all year (Talladega) and 6 top-10s. Keller signed with Phoenix Racing for 2006, but was released after just eight races.

Keller was consistent in the first eight races. He ran the No. 1 Miccosukee Dodge to a best finish of 11th at Daytona, but he was running 12th in points after the eighth race of the year. However, on April 18, 2006, Keller was released from the team in what many viewed as a "cheap shot" from Finch. He was replaced by Mike Wallace. Keller would then try to race the No. 34 Frank Cicci Racing Chevy at Richmond, but he did not qualify and declined further rides with the team. Instead, Brewco Motorsports hired Keller to qualify and practice Greg Biffle's No. 66 Ford for select races when Biffle was working on his Nextel Cup Series team. Keller did a good job, and Brewco rewarded Keller with a race at ORP. Keller ran in the top-five for the first half of his 400th career start, but a mid race spin dropped Keller to 15th in the rundown. Keller will drive part-time for Brewco Motorsports, sharing their No. 27 with NEXTEL Cup driver Ward Burton, as well as a part-time schedule for CJM Racing. On October 12, 2007, Keller broke Tommy Houston's record for most career starts in the Busch Series with his 418th appearance. He also holds the record for most Busch Series earnings with over $11M (USD).

In 2008 Keller drove for CJM Racing in their No. 11 Chevrolet in the Nationwide Series full-time with sponsorship from  America's Incredible Pizza Company. Keller tested the No. 98 for then-Evernham Motorsports at Daytona Preseason Thunder Testing. Keller was released from CJM Racing in September during the off week after the fall Richmond race and replaced by Scott Lagasse Jr., with AIPC citing that they wanted to take the company in a new direction.  He then signed with Baker Curb Racing to drive the No. 27 Ford Fusion through the rest of 2008 and 2009. For 2010, Keller drove for TriStar Motorsports in the No. 35, though the team had to get by with little to no sponsorship. Although he did not qualify for several races early in the season, by mid-year he had raced his way into the top-30 in owner's points, locking him into the remainder of the races. His best finish in 2010 was 4th at Talladega. Keller did not return to the team in 2011, and Mike Bliss took this place in the renumbered No. 19. His 2010 teammate Tony Raines was also replaced by Eric McClure, who brought sponsorship to the team. Keller has not raced in NASCAR since. On November 2011, Kenny Wallace surpassed Keller in the record books when he made his 520th Nationwide Series start, most all-time.

Motorsports career results

NASCAR
(key) (Bold – Pole position awarded by qualifying time. Italics – Pole position earned by points standings or practice time. * – Most laps led.)

Winston Cup Series

Nationwide Series

References

External links

1970 births
Living people
NASCAR drivers
Sportspeople from Greenville, South Carolina
Racing drivers from South Carolina
Dale Earnhardt Inc. drivers